The Škoda Rapid is a mid-size car that was made in Czechoslovakia by Škoda from 1935 to 1947. Škoda had first applied the "Rapid" name to a version of its 1,195 cc Popular Type 920 made in 1934–35. From 1935, however, it transferred the name to a new, larger model.

The Rapid Type 901 has a 1,386 cc sidevalve engine and was built 1935–38. It was succeeded by the Rapid OHV (Type 922) which has a 1,558 cc overhead valve engine and was built 1938–47.

There was a six-cylinder sister model, the Škoda Rapid Six (Type 910), with a 1,961 cc engine, which was launched in 1935.

In 1984 Škoda revived the "Rapid" name for the Rapid version of the Škoda 130. Since 2010 the company has used the name on a succession of models built in its factory at Pune in India.

Concept
In the 1930s Škoda introduced a new range of cars with a backbone chassis and all-round independent suspension. The backbone design was aimed to solve the lack of torsional stiffness in the ladder frame of previous models. The chassis was developed under the leadership of chief engineer Vladimír Matouš and derived from one designed by Hans Ledwinka for Tatra.

The first models in the new range were the Popular compact car in 1934, followed by the Superb full-size car. The mid-range Rapid was added in 1935. It was followed by the Favorit in 1936.

Type 901

The Rapid Type 901 (later Type 914) had a four-cylinder 1,386 cc,  sidevalve engine and ATE-Lockheed brakes. The choice of bodies offered included a two-door saloon, four-door saloon and two-door, four-seat convertible. There was also a commercial van version.

Type 922
Škoda revised the engine and in 1938 launched the Type 922, which it marketed as the Rapid OHV. The new model's fuel consumption was 10 litres per 100 km. The choice of bodies included two-door and four-door saloons.

In 1938 Škoda launched a streamlined version of the 1,558 cc Rapid OHV with a new aerodynamic two-door saloon body. It bears a strong resemblance to the streamlined four-door body that Škoda built for its Type 935 prototypes in 1935–38.

References

Sources

Automobiles with backbone chassis
Cars introduced in 1935
Cars of the Czech Republic
Rapid